Hachimanyama may refer to:

 Hachimanyama, Setagaya, a district in Setagaya ward in Tokyo
 Hachimanyama Castle, castle structure in Ōmihachiman, Shiga
 Hachimanyama Ropeway, aerial lift line in Ōmihachiman, Shiga
 Hachimanyama Station, railway station in Suginami, Tokyo